The Burning Trail is a 1925 American silent Western film directed by Arthur Rosson and starring William Desmond, Albert J. Smith, and Mary McIvor. After accidentally killing a man in a fight, a boxer heads West.

Plot
As described in a film magazine review, Smiling Bill wanders west to forget that he killed a man in the boxing ring, and goes into the desert. Meanwhile, he has incurred the enmity of Texas, a bad man. Texas gets a job at the Corliss ranch. Texas attempts to show the younger Corliss boy how to get stock across a neighboring sheepman's land. However, the boy loves the sheepman's daughter and does not want to stir up strife with him. A fight breaks out just as Bill arrives at the Corliss ranch, and he goes for the sheriff. Before the sheriff arrives, the elder Corliss is killed. Bill rescues the sheepman's daughter and another young woman.

Cast

References

External links
 
 

1925 films
1925 Western (genre) films
Films directed by Arthur Rosson
American black-and-white films
Universal Pictures films
Silent American Western (genre) films
1920s English-language films
1920s American films